Paapanaasam Raamayya Sivan (26 September 1890 – 1 October 1973) was an Indian composer of Carnatic music and a singer. He was awarded the Madras Music Academy's Sangeetha Kalanidhi in 1971. He was also a film score composer in Kannada cinema as well as Tamil cinema in the 1930s and 1940s.

Sivan was also known as Tamil Thyaagaraja. Using Classical South Indian as a base, Sivan created compositions popularised by M. K. Thyagaraja Bhagavathar, D. K. Pattammal, and M. S. Subbulakshmi.

In 1962, he was awarded the Sangeet Natak Akademi Fellowship conferred by Sangeet Natak Akademi, India's National Academy for Music, Dance and Drama.

Life 
Sivan's early years were spent in the Travancore area of Kerala. He was born at Polagam village in the district of Thanjavur, which was home to the musical trinity of Carnatic music. His given name was Ramaiya. In 1897, when he was 7, his father died. His mother Yogambal, along with her sons, left Thanjavur and moved to Travancore (now Thiruvananthapuram) in 1899 to seek the aid of his uncle. In Thiruvananthapuram, he learned Malayalam and later joined the Maharaja Sanskrit college and obtained a degree in grammar.

Ramaiya was very religious, and became even more so with the death of his mother Yogambal in 1910, when he was 20. He wandered from place to place visiting temples and singing devotional songs. He used to be an active participant in the devotional music sessions at the home of Neelakandasivan in Thiruvananthapuram where he learned many of Neelakandasivan's composition. In this period he went regularly to the temple at Papanasam, where he would smear bhasma all over his body. Hence people first began to refer him as Papanasam Sivan.

He took his first music lessons from Noorani Mahadeva Bhagavatar, son of Parameswara Bhagavatar. Later, he became the disciple of Konerirajapuram Vaidyanath Iyer, a well-known musician.

He was most interested in the devotional aspect of music. He preferred to sing devotional songs and encouraged other singers take part in sessions of devotional music with him. He was a regular performer in the main temple festivals in South India with his devotional songs.

He received the President Award in 1962, and in 1969 he received the Sangeetha Kalasikhamani Award bestowed on him by "The Indian Fine Arts Society, Chennai". He was conferred the Sangita Kalanidhi in 1971.

D K Pattammal and D K Jayaraman, the sister-brother duo who were both awarded Sangeeta Kalanidhi, were his disciples. He taught Pattammal many kritis, and she also sang many of Sivan's compositions for films.

Family 
Papanasam Sivan had an elder brother Rajagopal Iyer whose daughter, V. N. Janaki, was an actress who became the Chief minister of Tamil Nadu for a few days. He had four Children, 2 sons and 2 daughters namely P.S. Kirthivasan, P.S Ramadas, Smt. Neela Ramamurthy and Smt. Rukmini Ramani.
Sivan started conducting bhajanai in 1934. After his death, his daughter Rukmini Ramani (b 1939), an accomplished singer herself, and her son Ashok Ramani have carried on the bhajanai tradition.

Filmography
Sita Kalyanam (1935)
Pavalakkodi (1934)
Naveena Sadaram (1935)
Naveena Sarangadhara (1936)
Kuchela (1936)
Chinthamani (1937)
Sevasadanam (1938)
Yayathi (1938)
Mathru Bhoomi (1939)
Sivakavi (1943)
Haridas (1944)
Pankajavalli (1947)
Kannika (1947)
Bilhana (1948)
Naattiya Rani (1949)
Ambikapathy (1957)

Compositions

Notes

See also 
 List of Carnatic composers

Carnatic composers
1890 births
1973 deaths
People from Thanjavur district
Kannada film score composers
Tamil film score composers
Recipients of the Sangeet Natak Akademi Fellowship
Sangeetha Kalanidhi recipients
20th-century Indian composers
Recipients of the Padma Bhushan in arts
Indian male film score composers
20th-century male musicians